Ingrīda Andriņa (23 June 1944 – 17 September 2015) was a Latvian stage and film actress.

Biography
Born in Riga, Andriņa graduated from the All-Union State Institute of Cinematography in Moscow in 1967 and began working at the Latvian National Theatre. From 1966 she began appearing in films.

Andriņa is possibly best recalled internationally for her role as Agnes von Mönnikhusen in the 1969 Soviet Estonian language film Viimne reliikvia, directed by Grigori Kromanov.

Throughout her film career, Andriņa performed in Latvian-, Russian-, Estonian-, Azerbaijani- and Georgian-language films. Her last appearance was in the 2014 Latvian film Džimlai Rudis rallallā. 

Andriņa died unexpectedly in 2015 at the age of 71 and was interred at the Riga Forest Cemetery.

Selected filmography
Viimne reliikvia (1969)
Liberation, film series (1972)
Unfinished Supper (1979)
The Trust That Has Burst, television miniseries (1984)
Džimlai rūdi rallallā (2014)

References

External links 

Ingrīda Andriņa  at the  Latvian National Theatre

1944 births
2015 deaths
Latvian stage actresses
Latvian film actresses
Actors from Riga
Soviet film actresses
Burials at Forest Cemetery, Riga
20th-century Latvian actresses
21st-century Latvian actresses